The 1946 Detroit Titans football team was an American football team that represented the University of Detroit as an independent during the 1946 college football season. In their second season under head coach Chuck Baer, the Titans compiled a 6–4 record and outscored their opponents by a combined total of 214 to 134.

The team featured one of the top rushing offenses in the country. The Titans' backs tallied 2,632 rushing yards for the third highest total in the nation. Their average of 263.2 yards per game ranked fourth nationally. The team's backfield included halfbacks Bill Haley, Joe Wright, and Jack Kurkowski, quarterback Gene Malinowski, and fullbacks Al Schmidt and Len Rittof.

The team's assistant coaches were Lloyd Brazil (backfield coach and athletic director), John Shada (line coach), Ed J. Barbour (backfield coach), and Dr. Raymond D. Forsyth (team physician and trainer). End Wilbur Hintz and guard Bob Ivory were the team's co-captains.

The team played its home games at University of Detroit Stadium, which had a capacity of 20,000 persons. In the fall of 1946, the university had an enrollment of 5,000 men and 1,200 women.

Schedule

After the season

The 1947 NFL Draft was held on December 16, 1946. The following Titans were selected.

See also
 1946 in Michigan

References

External links
 1946 University of Detroit football programs

Detroit
Detroit Titans football seasons
Detroit Titans football
Detroit Titans football